Josef Pecanka (7 April 1925 – 28 July 2015) was an Austrian field hockey player, footballer, and coach.

External links
 

 Austria Archiv
 Rapid Archiv
 Josef Pecanka's obituary

1925 births
2015 deaths
Austrian male field hockey players
Olympic field hockey players of Austria
Field hockey players at the 1952 Summer Olympics
Austrian footballers
Austrian football managers
Association footballers not categorized by position
Austrian people of Czech descent